The Adventures of Paddington Bear is an animated children's television series based on the book Paddington Bear by Michael Bond and developed by Bruce Robb.

Produced by CINAR Corporation and Protecrea in co-production with Canal J for seasons 1 and 2, it was produced with the participation of Teletoon, TF1 and ITV – the latter for seasons 1 and 2. The series was broadcast from June 14, 1997 to February 2, 2000. 39 episodes (117 segments) were produced.

Plot
The show follows the adventures of a bear from Peru that comes to England after an earthquake that destroys his home. The Brown family finds him in Paddington Station.

Cast
Jonathan Kydd as Paddington
Jon Glover and John R. Hernandez as Mr. Henry Brown
Meriam Stover and Moir Leslie as Mrs. Mary Brown
Eve Karpf as Mrs. Sheila Bird
Jade Williams as Judy
Steven Webb as Jonathan
Nigel Lambert as Mr. Reginald Curry
Cyril Shaps as Mr. Samuel Gruber
Unknown voice actress as Aunt Lucy

Telecast and home media
The show was first introduced on Teletoon's launch in Canada. It was also shown on ITV in the United Kingdom and both Canal J and TF1 in France.

The show was aired in the U.S. on the Cookie Jar Toons block on This TV from November 2008 until August 2009. It was also shown on HBO (actually, its sister channel aired it in repeats until 2004) in the 1990s. In 2017, it aired on Starz Kids and Family until April 2020. It also aired on Light TV (now TheGrio.TV). Qubo Channel aired repeats of the show from October 7, 2018 until February 25, 2021.

HBO's sister company, Time-Life Home Video released the series on both VHS and DVD.

As of 2022, the show is now streaming on Paramount+ and Tubi.

Episodes

Season 1 (1997–98)
This is the first season to use cel animation.

Season 2 (1998–99)
This is the last season to use cel animation.

Season 3 (2000)
This is the only season to use digital ink-and-paint animation.

Notes

References

External links
The Adventures of Paddington Bear at DHX Media

 (official DHX Media-sponsored channel)

1997 Canadian television series debuts
2000 Canadian television series endings
1997 French television series debuts
2000 French television series endings
1990s Canadian animated television series
2000s Canadian animated television series
1990s French animated television series
2000s French animated television series
Canadian children's animated adventure television series
Canadian children's animated fantasy television series
ITV children's television shows
Television shows produced by Harlech Television (HTV)
Teletoon original programming
French children's animated adventure television series
French children's animated fantasy television series
Canadian television shows based on children's books
French television shows based on children's books
Animated television series about bears
Television series by FilmFair
Television series by Cookie Jar Entertainment
Television series by DHX Media
Paddington Bear
HBO original programming
English-language television shows
French-language television shows